Don't Let It Get You Down may refer to:

 "Don't Let It Get You Down" (Echo & the Bunnymen song), a 1997 song by British post-punk band Echo & the Bunnymen, from the album Evergreen
 "Don't Let It Get You Down", a 1972 song by English singer-songwriter Kevin Ayers, from the album Bananamour
 "Don't Let It Get You Down", a song by Joe Sample from the 1973 Crusaders album, The 2nd Crusade
 "Don't Let It Get You Down", a 2002 song by American indie rock band Spoon, from the album Kill the Moonlight
 "Don't Let It Get You Down", a 2006 song by German singer Mike Leon Grosch